Egypt is an unincorporated community in Marshall County, Alabama, United States, located  northwest of Arab.

References

Unincorporated communities in Marshall County, Alabama
Unincorporated communities in Alabama